The 1929 Missouri Tigers football team was an American football team that represented the University of Missouri in the Big Six Conference (Big 6) during the 1929 college football season. The team compiled a 5–2–1 record (3–1–1 against Big 6 opponents), finished in second place in the Big 6, and outscored opponents by a total of 78 to 28. Gwinn Henry was the head coach for the seventh of nine seasons. The team played its home games at Memorial Stadium in Columbia, Missouri.

The team's leading scorer was Russell Dills with 26 points.

Schedule

References

Missouri
Missouri Tigers football seasons
Missouri Tigers football